Dosh is the first solo studio album by American multi-instrumentalist Dosh. Originally released on Dinkytown Records in 2002, it was re-released on Anticon in 2003. It peaked at number 142 on the CMJ Radio 200 chart.

Critical reception
Chris Dahlen of Pitchfork gave the album a 7.4 out of 10, saying: "Each track sounds careful but chaotic, simple but extreme, as Dosh shines the spotlight on himself and then dissolves into a dozen layers of movement." He added: "More than a drum recital or a set of nice tunes, Dosh's debut is a showcase where he can craft meticulous tracks and then blitz them with spontaneous joy." Dave Segal of East Bay Express said: "His self-titled debut album serves as a calling card to procure work with hot vocalists or MCs seeking a crafty producer with unconventional skills to burn." He called it "a deft display of technical prowess that's begging for an adventurous singer or rapper."

Track listing

References

External links
 

2002 debut albums
Dosh albums
Anticon albums